Zollernalb – Sigmaringen is an electoral constituency (German: Wahlkreis) represented in the Bundestag. It elects one member via first-past-the-post voting. Under the current constituency numbering system, it is designated as constituency 295. It is located in southern Baden-Württemberg, comprising most of the district of Sigmaringen and Zollernalbkreis districts.

Zollernalb – Sigmaringen was created for the inaugural 1949 federal election. Since 2005, it has been represented by Thomas Bareiß of the Christian Democratic Union (CDU).

Geography
Zollernalb – Sigmaringen is located in southern Baden-Württemberg. As of the 2021 federal election, it comprises the district of Sigmaringen excluding the municipalities of Herdwangen-Schönach, Illmensee, Pfullendorf, and Wald as well as the district of Zollernalbkreis excluding the municipalities of Bisingen, Burladingen, Grosselfingen, Hechingen, Jungingen, and Rangendingen.

History
Zollernalb – Sigmaringen was created in 1949, then known as Balingen. It acquired its current name in the 1980 election. In the 1949 election, it was Württemberg-Hohenzollern constituency 4 in the numbering system. In the 1953 through 1961 elections, it was number 193. In the 1965 through 1976 elections, it was number 197. In the 1980 through 1998 elections, it was number 198. Since the 2002 election, it has been number 295.

Originally, the constituency comprised the districts of Balingen, Sigmaringen, Hechingen, and Münsingen. In the 1965 through 1976 elections, it comprised the districts of Balingen, Münsingen, Sigmaringen excluding the municipalities of Igelswies, Thalheim, Bärenthal, Beuron, Billafingen, Burgau, Langenenslingen and Achberg, and Hechingen excluding the municipality of Wilflingen, as well as the municipalities of St. Johann, Dettingen an der Erms, Grabenstetten, Hülben, and Bad Urach from the Reutlingen district and the municipality of Wangen from the Überlingen district.

In the 1980 through 1998 elections, it acquired a configuration similar to its current borders, but including the entirety of the Sigmaringen district. In the 2002 election, it also contained the municipalities of Altshausen, Boms, Ebenweiler, Ebersbach-Musbach, Eichstegen, Fleischwangen, Guggenhausen, Hoßkirch, Königseggwald, Riedhausen, and Unterwaldhausen from the Ravensburg district. In the 2009 election, it lost its area in the Ravensburg district as well as the municipalities of Herdwangen-Schönach, Illmensee, Pfullendorf, and Wald from the Sigmaringen district.

Members
The constituency has been held continuously by the Christian Democratic Union (CDU) since its creation. It was first represented by Franz Weiß from 1949 to 1953, followed by Gebhard Müller from 1953 to 1957 and Walter Gaßmann from 1957 to 1965. Hermann Schwörer was representative from 1965 to 1994, a total of eight consecutive terms. Dietmar Schlee served from 1994 to 2002, followed by Tanja Gönner from 2002 to 2005. Thomas Bareiß has been representative since 2005.

Election results

2021 election

2017 election

2013 election

2009 election

References

Federal electoral districts in Baden-Württemberg
1949 establishments in West Germany
Constituencies established in 1949
Sigmaringen (district)
Zollernalbkreis